Club Atlético Aguada, commonly known as simply Aguada, is a Uruguyan basketball team based in Montevideo. The club was established in February 1922. Aguada plays in the Liga Uruguaya de Basketball (LUB) and has won the championship three times.

Honours
Liga Uruguaya de Basketball
Champions (3): 2012–13, 2018–19, 2019–20

Players

Current roster

Depth chart

Individual awards
Liga Uruguaya de Básquetbol MVP
Leandro García Morales – 2013
Andrew Freeley - 2019
Dwayne Davis – 2020

References

External links
Official website

Basketball teams in Uruguay
Sport in Montevideo
Basketball teams established in 1922